|}

The Rockfel Stakes is a Group 2 flat horse race in Great Britain open to two-year-old fillies. It is run on the Rowley Mile at Newmarket over a distance of 7 furlongs (1,408 metres), and it is scheduled to take place each year in September.

History
The event is named after Rockfel, a successful filly whose victories included two Classics in 1938. It was established in 1981, and its first winner was Top Hope.

The Rockfel Stakes attained Listed status in 1985, and it was promoted to Group 3 level in 1986. It was upgraded to Group 2 in 1998.

The race was formerly staged during Newmarket's Champions' Day meeting in mid-October. It became part of a new fixture called Future Champions Day in 2011 and was moved to a September date from 2014, switching places in the calendar with the Fillies' Mile. The race is currently part of the Breeders' Cup Challenge and the winner earns an automatic place in the Breeders' Cup Juvenile Fillies Turf race.

The leading horses from the Rockfel Stakes sometimes go on to compete in the following season's 1000 Guineas. Four fillies have won both events, the most recent being Finsceal Beo (2006–07).

Records

Leading jockey (4 wins):
 Michael Hills – Negligent (1989), Hula Angel (1998), Maids Causeway (2004), Just The Judge (2012)
 Frankie Dettori - Crystal Gazing (1990), Moonlight Paradise (1996), Spain Burg (2016), Juliet Capulet (2017)

Leading trainer (4 wins):
 Barry Hills – Negligent (1989), Yawl (1992), Hula Angel (1998), Maids Causeway (2004)

Winners

See also
 Horse racing in Great Britain
 List of British flat horse races

References

 Paris-Turf: 
 Racing Post:

 galopp-sieger.de – Rockfel Stakes.
 ifhaonline.org – International Federation of Horseracing Authorities – Rockfel Stakes (2019).
 pedigreequery.com – Rockfel Stakes – Newmarket.
 

Flat races in Great Britain
Newmarket Racecourse
Flat horse races for two-year-old fillies
Recurring sporting events established in 1981
Breeders' Cup Challenge series
1981 establishments in England